Anton "Mutz" Ens (February 2, 1887 - June 28, 1950) played Major League Baseball in 1912 with the Chicago White Sox. He played 3 games as a first baseman and had zero hits in six at-bats. At first base he recorded 12 putouts and 2 errors for a fielding percentage of .857. His brother, Jewel Ens, also played professional baseball.

He died in his home town of St. Louis, Missouri, at the age of 65.

External links

 

1884 births
1950 deaths
Chicago White Sox players
Major League Baseball first basemen
Baseball players from St. Louis
Galesburg Pavers players
Milwaukee Creams players
Fond du Lac Molls players
Bridgeport Crossmen players
St. Joseph Drummers players
Waterloo Shamrocks players
Muskogee Mets players